Hopi Buttes volcanic field is a monogenetic volcanic field located on the Colorado Plateau mostly on the Navajo Reservation around the town of Dilkon in northeastern Arizona north of Holbrook.

The erosional exposure of the deposits varies with those in the eastern portion exhibiting the shallowly eroded maar deposits and those in the western portion the more deeply eroded feeder diatremes.  The maars result from explosive interaction of the hot diatreme material with the groundwater system and result in a mixture of volcanic tuff material and sediments of the Miocene–Pliocene lacustrine sediments of the Bidahochi Formation. In the western portion of the field the buttes consist of the feeder diatremes of monchiquite and nepheline syenite magmas.

Most of the volcanic activity occurred between 8.5 and 6 million years ago, with the most recent dated at 4.2 million years ago.

Notable vents

See also
 List of volcanoes in the United States of America

References

Volcanic fields of Arizona
Landforms of Apache County, Arizona
Monogenetic volcanic fields
Geography of the Navajo Nation
Miocene volcanism
Pliocene volcanism